Sargon of Akkad (Šarrugi), also known as Sargon the Great, was the first ruler of the Akkadian Empire, known for his conquests of the Sumerian city-states in the 24th to 23rd centuries BC. He is sometimes identified as the first person in recorded history to rule over an empire.
 
He was the founder of the "Sargonic" or "Old Akkadian" dynasty, which ruled for about a century after his death until the Gutian conquest of Sumer.
The Sumerian king list makes him the cup-bearer to king Ur-Zababa of Kish.

His empire is thought to have included most of Mesopotamia, parts of the Levant, besides incursions into Hurrian and Elamite territory, ruling from his (archaeologically as yet unidentified) capital, Akkad (also Agade).

Sargon appears as a legendary figure in Neo-Assyrian literature of the 8th to 7th centuries BC.
Tablets with fragments of a Sargon Birth Legend were found in the Library of Ashurbanipal.

Name

The Akkadian name is normalized as either Šarru-ukīn or Šarru-kēn. The name's cuneiform spelling is variously LUGAL-ú-kin, 
šar-ru-gen6, šar-ru-ki-in, šar-ru-um-ki-in. 
In Late Assyrian references, the name is mostly spelled as LUGAL-GI.NA or LUGAL-GIN, i.e. identical to the name of the Neo-Assyrian king Sargon II.

The first element in the name is šarru, the Akkadian (East Semitic) for "king" (c.f. Hebrew sár ). The second element is derived from the verb kīnum "to confirm, establish" (related to Hebrew kūn ).

A possible interpretation of the reading Šarru-ukīn is "the king has established (stability)" or "he [the god] has established the king". Such a name would however be unusual; other names in -ukīn always include both a subject and an object, as in Šamaš-šuma-ukīn "Shamash has established an heir".
There is some debate over whether the name was an adopted regnal name or a birth name. 
The reading Šarru-kēn has been interpreted adjectivally, as "the king is established; legitimate", expanded as a phrase šarrum ki(e)num.

The terms "Pre-Sargonic" and "Post-Sargonic" were used in Assyriology based on the chronologies of Nabonidus before the historical existence of Sargon of Akkad was confirmed. 
The form Šarru-ukīn was known from the Assyrian Sargon Legend discovered in 1867 in Library of Ashurbanipal at Nineveh.
A contemporary reference to Sargon thought to have been found on the cylinder seal of Ibni-sharru, a high-ranking official serving under Sargon. Joachim Menant published a description of this seal in 1877, reading the king's name as Shegani-shar-lukh, and did not yet identify it with "Sargon the Elder" (who was identified with the Old Assyrian king Sargon I).
In 1883, the British Museum acquired the "mace-head of Shar-Gani-sharri", a votive gift deposited at the temple of Shamash in Sippar. This "Shar-Gani" was identified with the Sargon of Agade of Assyrian legend.
The identification of "Shar-Gani-sharri" with Sargon was recognised as mistaken in the 1910s. Shar-Gani-sharri (Shar-Kali-Sharri) is, in fact, Sargon's great-grandson, the successor of Naram-Sin.

It is not entirely clear whether the Neo-Assyrian king Sargon II was directly named for Sargon of Akkad, as there is some uncertainty whether his name should be rendered Šarru-ukīn or as Šarru-kēn(u).

Chronology

Primary sources pertaining to Sargon are sparse; the main near-contemporary reference is that in the various versions of the Sumerian King List.
Here, Sargon is mentioned as the son of a gardener, former cup-bearer of Ur-Zababa of Kish. He usurped the kingship from Lugal-zage-si of Uruk and took it to his own city of Akkad. Note that the Weidner chronicle has Sargon ruling directly after Ur-Zababa and does not mention Lugal-zage-si. Various copies of the king list give the duration of his reign as either 40 or 54-56 years. Numerous fragmentary inscriptions relating to Sargon are also known.

In absolute years, his reign would correspond to c. 2334–2279 BC in the middle chronology. His successors until the Gutian conquest of Sumer are also known as the "Sargonic Dynasty" and their rule as the "Sargonic Period" of Mesopotamian history.

Foster (1982) argued that the reading of 55 years as the duration of Sargon's reign was, in fact, a corruption of an original interpretation of 37 years. An older version of the king list gives Sargon's reign as lasting for 40 years.

Thorkild Jacobsen marked the clause about Sargon's father being a gardener as a lacuna, indicating his uncertainty about its meaning. Ur-Zababa and Lugal-zage-si are both listed as kings, but separated by several additional named rulers of Kish, who seem to have been merely governors or vassals under the Akkadian Empire.

The claim that Sargon was the original founder of Akkad has been called into question with the discovery of an inscription mentioning the place and dated to the first year of Enshakushanna, who almost certainly preceded him. The Weidner Chronicle (ABC 19:51) states that it was Sargon who "built Babylon in front of Akkad." The Chronicle of Early Kings (ABC 20:18–19) likewise states that late in his reign, Sargon "dug up the soil of the pit of Babylon, and made a counterpart of Babylon next to Agade." Van de Mieroop suggested that those two chronicles may refer to the much later Assyrian king, Sargon II of the Neo-Assyrian Empire, rather than to Sargon of Akkad.

Some of the regnal year names of Sargon are preserved, and throw some light in the events of his reign, particularly the conquest of the surrounding territories of Simurrum, Elam and Mari, and Uru'a, thought to be a city in Elam:

Historiography

Language and script used in records
Sargon appears to have promoted the use of Semitic (Akkadian) in inscriptions.
He frequently calls himself "king of Akkad" first, after he apparently founded the city of Akkad. He appears to have taken over the rule of Kish at some point, and later also much of Mesopotamia, referring to himself as
"Sargon, king of Akkad, overseer of Inanna, king of Kish, anointed of Anu, king of the land [Mesopotamia], governor (ensi) of Enlil".

During Sargon's reign, East Semitic was standardized and adapted for use with the cuneiform script previously used in the Sumerian language into what is now known as the "Akkadian language". A style of calligraphy developed in which text on clay tablets and cylinder seals was arranged amidst scenes of mythology and ritual.

Year names
While various copies of the Sumerian king list and later Babylonian chronicles credit Sargon with a reign length ranging from 34 to 56 years, dated documents have been found for only four different year-names of his actual reign. The names of these four years describe his campaigns against Elam, Mari, Simurrum (a Hurrian region), and Uru'a (an Elamite city-state).

Nippur inscription

Among the most important sources for Sargon's reign is a tablet of the Old Babylonian period recovered at Nippur in the University of Pennsylvania expedition in the 1890s. The tablet is a copy of the inscriptions on the pedestal of a statue erected by Sargon in the temple of Enlil. Its text was edited by Arno Poebel (1909) and Leon Legrain (1926).

Conquest of Sumer
In the inscription, Sargon styles himself "Sargon, king of Akkad, overseer (mashkim) of Inanna, king of Kish, anointed (guda) of Anu, king of the land [Mesopotamia], governor (ensi) of Enlil". 

It celebrates the conquest of Uruk and the defeat of Lugalzagesi, whom Sargon brought "in a collar to the gate of Enlil":

Sargon then conquered Ur and E-Ninmar and "laid waste" the territory from Lagash to the sea, and from there went on to conquer and destroy Umma:

Sargon permitted the inhabitants of the territories he conquered to retain their native leaders and traditions. Yet, they were obligated to follow him and pay a tribute in exchange for safety. The people of Sargon's dominion were devoted to him because of his policies, which served to maintain peace. In addition, he proclaimed Akkadian the official language of the government and imposed regular weights and measurements.

Conquest of Upper Mesopotamia, as far as the Mediterranean Sea
Submitting himself to the (Levantine god) Dagan, Sargon conquered territories of Upper Mesopotamia and the Levant, including Mari, Yarmuti (Jarmuth?) and Ibla "up to the Cedar Forest (the Amanus) and up to the Silver Mountain (Aladagh?)", ruling from the "upper sea" (Mediterranean) to the "lower sea" (Persian Gulf).

Conquests of Elam and Marhashi
Sargon also claims in his inscriptions that he is "Sargon, king of the world, conqueror of Elam and Parahshum", the two major polities to the east of Sumer. He also names various rulers of the east whom he vanquished, such as "Luh-uh-ish-an, son of Hishibrasini, king of Elam, king of Elam" or "Sidga'u, general of Parahshum", who later also appears in an inscription by Rimush.

Sargon triumphed over 34 cities in total. Ships from Meluhha, Magan and Dilmun, rode at anchor in his capital of Akkad.

He entertained a court or standing army of 5,400 men who "ate bread daily before him".

Sargon Epos

A group of four Babylonian texts, summarized as "Sargon Epos" or Res Gestae Sargonis, shows Sargon as a military commander asking the advice of many subordinates before going on campaigns. 
The narrative of Sargon, the Conquering Hero, is set at Sargon's court, in a situation of crisis. Sargon addresses his warriors, praising the virtue of heroism, and a lecture by a courtier on the glory achieved by a champion of the army, a narrative relating a campaign of Sargon's into the far land of Uta-raspashtim, including an account of a "darkening of the Sun" and the conquest of the land of Simurrum, 
and a concluding oration by Sargon listing his conquests.

The narrative of King of Battle relates Sargon's campaign against the Anatolian city of Purushanda in order to protect his merchants.
Versions of this narrative in both Hittite and Akkadian have been found. 
The Hittite version is extant in six fragments, the Akkadian version is known from several manuscripts 
found at Amarna, Assur, and Nineveh.
The narrative is anachronistic, portraying Sargon in a 19th-century milieu. The same text mentions that Sargon crossed the Sea of the West (Mediterranean Sea) and ended up in Kuppara, which some authors have interpreted as the Akkadian word for Keftiu, an ancient locale usually associated with Crete or Cyprus.

Famine and war threatened Sargon's empire during the latter years of his reign. The Chronicle of Early Kings reports that revolts broke out throughout the area under the last years of his overlordship:

A. Leo Oppenheim translates the last sentence as "From the East to the West he [i.e. Marduk] alienated (them) from him and inflicted upon (him as punishment) that he could not rest (in his grave)."

Chronicle of Early Kings

Shortly after securing Sumer, Sargon embarked on a series of campaigns to subjugate the entire Fertile Crescent. According to the Chronicle of Early Kings, a later Babylonian historiographical text:

In the east, Sargon defeated four leaders of Elam, led by the king of Awan. Their cities were sacked; the governors, viceroys, and kings of Susa, Waraḫše, and neighboring districts became vassals of Akkad.

Origin legends
Sargon became the subject of legendary narratives describing his rise to power from humble origins and his conquest of Mesopotamia in later Assyrian and Babylonian literature. Apart from these secondary, and partly legendary, accounts, there are many inscriptions due to Sargon himself, although the majority of these are known only from much later copies. The Louvre has fragments of two Sargonic victory steles recovered from Susa (where
they were presumably transported from Mesopotamia in the 12th century BC).<ref>
Lorenzo Nigro, "The Two Steles of Sargon: Iconology and Visual Propaganda at the Beginning of Royal Akkadian Relief" Iraq LX (1998);
Louvre Sb1 
(Stèle de victoire de Sargon, roi d'Akkad, Apportée à Suse, Iran, en butin de guerre au XIIe siècle avant J.-C. Fouilles J. de Morgan).</ref>

Sumerian legend
The Sumerian-language Sargon legend contains a legendary account of Sargon's rise to power. It is an older version of the previously known Assyrian legend, discovered in 1974 in Nippur and first edited in 1983.

The extant versions are incomplete, but the surviving fragments name Sargon's father as La'ibum. After a lacuna, the text skips to Ur-Zababa, king of Kish, who awakens after a dream, the contents of which are not revealed on the surviving portion of the tablet. For unknown reasons, Ur-Zababa appoints Sargon as his cup-bearer. Soon after this, Ur-Zababa invites Sargon to his chambers to discuss a dream of Sargon's, involving the favor of the goddess Inanna and the drowning of Ur-Zababa by the goddess in a river of blood. Deeply frightened, Ur-Zababa orders Sargon murdered by the hands of Beliš-tikal, the chief smith, but Inanna prevents it, demanding that Sargon stop at the gates because of his being "polluted with blood." When Sargon returns to Ur-Zababa, the king becomes frightened again and decides to send Sargon to king Lugal-zage-si of Uruk with a message on a clay tablet asking him to slay Sargon. The legend breaks off at this point; presumably, the missing sections described how Sargon becomes king.

The part of the interpretation of the king's dream has parallels to the biblical story of Joseph, the part about the letter with the carrier's death sentence has similarities to the Greek story of Bellerophon and the biblical story of Uriah.

 Birth legend

A Neo-Assyrian text from the 7th century BC purporting to be Sargon's autobiography asserts that the great king was the illegitimate son of a priestess. 
Only the beginning of the text (the first two columns) is known, from the fragments of three manuscripts. 
The first fragments were discovered as early as 1850.
Sargon's birth and his early childhood are described thus: 

Similarities between the Sargon Birth Legend and other infant birth exposures in ancient literature, including Moses, Karna, and Oedipus, were noted by psychoanalyst Otto Rank in his 1909 book The Myth of the Birth of the Hero. The legend was also studied in detail by Brian Lewis, and compared with many different examples of the infant birth exposure motif found in European and Asian folktales. He discusses a possible archetype form, giving particular attention to the Sargon legend and the account of the birth of Moses. Joseph Campbell has also made such comparisons.

Sargon is also one of the many suggestions for the identity or inspiration for the biblical Nimrod. Ewing William (1910) suggested Sargon based on his unification of the Babylonians and the Neo-Assyrian birth legend. Yigal Levin (2002) suggested that Nimrod was a recollection of Sargon and his grandson Naram-Sin, with the name "Nimrod" derived from the latter.

Family

The name of Sargon's main wife, Queen Tashlultum, and those of a number of his children are known to us. His daughter Enheduanna was a high priestess of the moon God in Ur who composed ritual hymns. Many of her works, including her Exaltation of Inanna, were in use for centuries thereafter. Sargon was succeeded by his son Rimush; after Rimush's death another son, Manishtushu, became king. Manishtushu would be succeeded by his own son, Naram-Sin. Two other sons, Shu-Enlil (Ibarum) and Ilaba'is-takal (Abaish-Takal), are known.

Legacy

Sargon of Akkad is sometimes identified as the first person in recorded history to rule over an empire (in the sense of the central government of a multi-ethnic territory), although earlier Sumerian rulers such as Lugal-zage-si might have a similar claim. His rule also heralds the history of Semitic empires in the Ancient Near East, which, following the Neo-Sumerian interruption (21st/20th centuries BC), lasted for close to fifteen centuries until the Achaemenid conquest following the 539 BC Battle of Opis.

Sargon was regarded as a model by Mesopotamian kings for some two millennia after his death. The Assyrian and Babylonian kings who based their empires in Mesopotamia saw themselves as the heirs of Sargon's empire. 
Sargon may indeed have introduced the notion of "empire" as understood in the later Assyrian period; the Neo-Assyrian Sargon Text, written in the first person, has Sargon challenging later rulers to "govern the black-headed people" (i.e. the indigenous population of Mesopotamia) as he did. An important source for "Sargonic heroes" in oral tradition in the later Bronze Age is a Middle Hittite (15th century BC) record of a Hurro-Hittite song, which calls upon Sargon and his immediate successors as "deified kings" (dšarrena).

Sargon shared his name with two later Mesopotamian kings. Sargon I was a king of the Old Assyrian period presumably named after Sargon of Akkad. Sargon II was a Neo-Assyrian king named after Sargon of Akkad; it is this king whose name was rendered Sargon in the Hebrew Bible (Isaiah 20:1).

Neo-Babylonian king Nabonidus showed great interest in the history of the Sargonid dynasty and even conducted excavations of Sargon's palaces and those of his successors.

Popular culture

Although historically inaccurate and supernatural in nature, The Scorpion King: Rise of a Warrior (2008) features Sargon of Akkad as a murderous army commander who uses black magic. He was the film's main villain and was portrayed by American actor and mixed martial artist Randy Couture. This is one of the few films, if not the only one, to depict Sargon.

The twentieth episode of the second season of Star Trek: The Original Series, "Return to Tomorrow", features an ancient, telepathic alien named Sargon who once ruled a mighty empire.

American Rock Group They Might Be Giants refer to Sargon of Akkad in the track "The Mesopotamians" on their 2007 album The Else, along with Hammurabi, Ashurbanipal and Gilgamesh.

Carl Benjamin, British far-right YouTuber and political commentator, goes by the online pseudonym "Sargon of Akkad", with a profile picture of him on his YouTube channel.

See also

 
History of Mesopotamia
List of kings of Akkad

Notes

References
Albright, W. F., A Babylonian Geographical Treatise on Sargon of Akkad's Empire, Journal of the American Oriental Society (1925).
Bachvarova, Mary R., "Sargon the Great: from history to myth", chapter 8 in: From Hittite to Homer: The Anatolian Background of Ancient Greek Epic' , Cambridge University Press (2016), 166–198.
Beaulieu, Paul-Alain, et al. A Companion to the Ancient near East. Blackwell, 2005.
Botsforth, George W., ed. "The Reign of Sargon". A Source-Book of Ancient History. New York: Macmillan, 1912.
Cooper, Jerrold S. and Wolfgang Heimpel. "The Sumerian Sargon Legend." Journal of the American Oriental Society, Vol. 103, No. 1, (January–March 1983).
Foster, Benjamin R., The Age of Akkad. Inventing Empire in Ancient Mesopotamia, Routledge, 2016.
Frayne, Douglas R. "Sargonic and Gutian Period." The Royal Inscriptions of Mesopotamia, Vol. 2. University of Toronto Press, 1993.
Gadd, C. J. "The Dynasty of Agade and the Gutian Invasion." Cambridge Ancient History, rev. ed., vol. 1, ch. 19. Cambridge Univ. Press, 1963.
Glassner, Jean-Jacques. Mesopotamian Chronicles, Atlanta, 2004.
Grayson, Albert Kirk. Assyrian and Babylonian Chronicles. J. J. Augustin, 1975; Eisenbrauns, 2000.
Jacobsen, Thorkild, The Sumerian King List, Assyriological Studies, No. 11, Chicago: Oriental Institute, 1939.
King, L. W., Chronicles Concerning Early Babylonian Kings, II, London, 1907, pp.  87–96.
Kramer, S. Noah. The Sumerians: Their History, Culture and Character, Chicago, 1963.
Kramer, S. Noah. History Begins at Sumer: Thirty-Nine "Firsts" in Recorded History. Univ. of Pennsylvania Press, 1981.
Lewis, Brian. The Sargon Legend: A Study of the Akkadian Text and the Tale of the Hero Who Was Exposed at Birth. American Schools of Oriental Research Dissertation Series, No. 4. Cambridge, MA: American Schools of Oriental Research, 1984.
Luckenbill, D. D., On the Opening Lines of the Legend of Sargon, The American Journal of Semitic Languages and Literatures (1917).
Postgate, Nicholas. Early Mesopotamia: Society and Economy at the Dawn of History. Routledge, 1994.
Roux, G. Ancient Iraq, London, 1980.

Schomp, Virginia. Ancient Mesopotamia. Franklin Watts, 2005. 
Van de Mieroop, Marc. A History of the Ancient Near East: ca. 3000–323 BC. Blackwell, 2006, .
Van de Mieroop, Marc., Cuneiform Texts and the Writing of History'', Routledge, 1999.

24th-century BC kings of Akkad
23rd-century BC kings of Akkad
Founding monarchs
24th-century BC births
23rd-century BC deaths
Nimrod
Kings of the Universe
Cup-bearers